Sergei Iosifovich Vyshedkevich (born January 3, 1975) is a Russian former professional ice hockey defenseman who last played for Torpedo Nizhny Novgorod of the Kontinental Hockey League.  He was drafted by the New Jersey Devils in the third round, 70th overall, of the 1995 NHL Entry Draft.

Career
After playing two seasons with Dynamo Moscow, Vyshedkevich came to North America to play with the Devils' AHL affiliate, the Albany River Rats, in the 1996–97 season.  Vyshedkevich played three full seasons with the River Rats before the Devils traded him to the expansion Atlanta Thrashers as part of a deal during the 1999 NHL Expansion Draft.

While with the Thrashers, Vyshedkevich appeared in 30 NHL games across two seasons, scoring two goals and adding five assists.  During the 2001–02 season, the Thrashers traded him to the Mighty Ducks of Anaheim along with Scott Langkow in exchange for Ladislav Kohn.  He finished the season with Anaheim's AHL affiliate, the Cincinnati Mighty Ducks.  He returned to Russia to play for Dynamo Moscow of the Russian Super League the following season.

He spent his final professional season with Torpedo Nizhny Novgorod of the Kontinental Hockey League, successor to the RSL.

Honours
International Hockey League:  1995 (with Dynamo)
Russian Championship:  2005
European Champions cup:  2006

Career statistics

International statistics

External links

1975 births
Living people
Albany River Rats players
Atlanta Thrashers players
Cincinnati Mighty Ducks players
HC Dynamo Moscow players
New Jersey Devils draft picks
Orlando Solar Bears (IHL) players
People from Dedovsk
Russian ice hockey defencemen
Torpedo Nizhny Novgorod players
Sportspeople from Moscow Oblast